Robert Geritzmann (February 9, 1893 – September 12, 1969) was a German politician of the Social Democratic Party (SPD) and member of the German Bundestag.

Life 
From 1946 to 1963 he was Lord Mayor of Gelsenkirchen. He also belonged to the German Bundestag from its first election in 1949 to 1961. He was always directly elected in the constituency of Gelsenkirchen.

Literature

References

1893 births
1969 deaths
Members of the Bundestag for North Rhine-Westphalia
Members of the Bundestag 1957–1961
Members of the Bundestag 1953–1957
Members of the Bundestag 1949–1953
Members of the Bundestag for the Social Democratic Party of Germany